McLain's Independent Battery Colorado Light Artillery was an artillery battery that served in the Union Army during the American Civil War.  It was sometimes misspelled as "McLane's Battery".

Service
The battery was organized at Denver, Colorado Territory, on December 15, 1862, and mustered in under the command of Captain William D. McLain.

The battery was attached to the District of Colorado to July 1864. District of Upper Arkansas to December 1864. District of South Kansas to April 1865. District of North Kansas to August 1865.

McLain's Independent Battery Colorado Light Artillery mustered out of service on August 31, 1865.

Detailed service
Duty at Fort Lyon, Colorado Territory, operating against Indians, December 1862 to July 1863. At Camp Weld until December 1863. Scout from Fort Garland, Colorado Territory, October 12–16, 1863. At Denver December 1863 to June 1864. Expedition from Denver to Republican River, Kansas, April 8–23, 1864. Action at Big Bushes, Smoky Hill, Kansas, April 16. Ordered to District of Kansas June 1864. At Fort Larned, District of South Kansas, until August 1864. (A detachment was at Lawrence, Kansas.) Ordered to Lawrence August 9, and duty in District of Upper Arkansas. Stationed at Paola, Kansas until October. Operations against Price's Invasion October-November. Actions at Little Blue October 21. Big Blue October 22. Westport October 23. Pursuit of Price October 24-December 2. Mine Creek, Marias Des Cygnes, Charlot, October 25. Newtonia October 28. Cane Hill, November 6. At Paola until May 1865. Ordered to Fort Scott and Fort Gibson, and duty in District of North Kansas until August.

Commanders
 Captain William D. McLain

See also

 List of Colorado Civil War units
 Colorado in the Civil War

References
 Dyer, Frederick H.  A Compendium of the War of the Rebellion (Des Moines, IA:  Dyer Pub. Co.), 1908.
Attribution

External links
 McLain's Battery living history organization

Military units and formations established in 1862
Military units and formations disestablished in 1865
McLain's Independent Light Artillery Battery
1862 establishments in Colorado Territory
Artillery units and formations of the American Civil War